Ahmad Zia Saraj was the interim director of the National Directorate of Security (NDS) in Afghanistan until Afghanistan was conquered by Taliban on August 15, 2021. He was a senior government official in Afghanistan and had previously served as deputy operational chief of NDS. Ashraf Ghani, on 9 September 2019, introduced Ahmad Zia Siraj as the new acting chief of the Afghan intelligence.

References 

21st-century Afghan politicians
Year of birth missing (living people)
Living people
Place of birth missing (living people)